Aatif Chahechouhe (born 2 July 1986) is a professional footballer who plays as an attacking midfielder or winger. Born in France, he represents the Morocco national team at international level.

Club career

Born in Fontenay-aux-Roses, France to Moroccan parents, Chahechouhe holds French citizenship. Having played for a number of teams in the French lower leagues, Chahechouhe joined AS Nancy on 9 July 2009 after a short stint with Championnat de France amateur side Olympique Noisy-le-Sec. On 24 April 2010, he made his professional debut in a league match against Montpellier.

He joined Bulgarian side Chernomorets Burgas in January 2012 and scored 10 goals in 15 matches, attracting the attention of Turkish Süper Lig side Sivasspor, who paid a €500,000 transfer fee that summer.

Chahechouhe finished the 2013–14 season as the Süper Lig's top-scorer with 17 goals, helping Sivasspor to a fifth-place finish and qualification to the UEFA Europa League. Towards the end of the season, he received his first international call up for Morocco national team's friendly match with Gabon.

On 13 January 2021, Chahechouhe agreed with another Süper Lig club BB Erzurumspor. His contract was terminated on 22 April in same year.

International career
Chahechouhe made his debut for Morocco on 23 May 2014 against Mozambique.

Career statistics
Scores and results table. Morocco's goal tally first:

Honours
Individual
Süper Lig top scorer: 2013–14 (17 goals)

References

External links

Aatif Chahechouhe career stats at foot-national.com
Aatif Chahechouhe scores awesome goal for Chernomorets Burgas at youtube.com

1986 births
Living people
People from Fontenay-aux-Roses
Footballers from Hauts-de-Seine
French footballers
Moroccan footballers
Morocco international footballers
Association football midfielders
CS Sedan Ardennes players
Entente SSG players
Olympique Noisy-le-Sec players
AS Nancy Lorraine players
PFC Chernomorets Burgas players
Sivasspor footballers
Fenerbahçe S.K. footballers
Çaykur Rizespor footballers
Antalyaspor footballers
Fatih Karagümrük S.K. footballers
Büyükşehir Belediye Erzurumspor footballers
Ligue 1 players
Championnat National 2 players
First Professional Football League (Bulgaria) players
Süper Lig players
French expatriate footballers
Moroccan expatriate footballers
Expatriate footballers in Bulgaria
Expatriate footballers in Turkey
French expatriate sportspeople in Bulgaria
French expatriate sportspeople in Turkey
Moroccan expatriate sportspeople in Bulgaria
Moroccan expatriate sportspeople in Turkey
French sportspeople of Moroccan descent